Special Forces is a 2003 American war film directed by Isaac Florentine and written by David N. White. The film stars Marshall R. Teague, Tim Abell and Danny Lee Clark.

Synopsis
In the aftermath of the war in Bosnia, former Bosnian Army General Hasib Rafendek (Eli Danker), who is convicted of war crimes has taken command of the military of the former Soviet republic of Muldonia.

In a Hezbollah terrorist camp, a U.S. Army private is being held hostage. His interrogator decides to terrorise him with a revolver. Meanwhile, an elite Special Forces team infiltrates the camp to rescue him. Eventually, they're spotted, and are forced to open fire on the terrorists. The team rescues the private and flee in a boat back to friendly territory. Which is followed by another mission of rescuing an American journalist. The movie mainly focuses upon the impossible rescue mission.

Cast
 Marshall R. Teague as Major Don Harding
 Tim Abell as Jess
 Danny Lee Clark as "Bear"
 Troy Mittleider as Wyatt
 Daniella Deutscher as Wendy Teller
 T.J. Rotolo as Reyes
 Eli Danker as Hasib Rafendek
 Scott Adkins as Talbot
 Vladislavas Jacukevicius as Zaman
 Michael Saad as President Hrankoff
 Rimantė Valiukaitė as Saira
 Andrius Zebrauskas as Bureaucrat
 Cezaris Grauzinis as Muldan Soldier
 Henrikas Savickas as Vassily Nagayev
 Geoff Parish as Private Regional Command
 Adomas Gotesmonas as Little Boy
 Kestutis Jakstas as British Prisoner
 Dainius Kazlauskas as Terrorist
 Audrius Bruzas as U.S. Soldier #1

External links
 
 

2003 films
2003 action thriller films
American war films
Films about the United States Army
Films directed by Isaac Florentine
Films set in 1995
2000s English-language films
Films produced by Boaz Davidson
2000s American films